Aventinus may refer to:

Places:
 Aventinus, Latin name of Abensberg, Germany
 Aventine Hill, named after Aventinus, king of Alba and Latium 
Persons:
 Aventinus (mythology), son of Hercules and Rhea
 Aventinus of Alba Longa, descendant of Aeneas, king of the Latins (future Rome site)
 Saint Aventinus (d. c 537), disciple of St. Loup 
 Aventinus of Tours (d. 1180), hermit and saint
 Johannes Aventinus, Bavarian historian and philologist
Others:
 Aventinus (beer), a wheat doppelbock brewed by G. Schneider & Sohn, in Bavaria, Germany

See also
Aventine

Latin-language surnames